The singles discography of American country music singer Reba McEntire contains 126 singles. They are further categorized by 100 released as a lead artist, seven as a featured artist and 19 that were issued as promotional singles. In addition to singles, eight unofficial singles were released and made charting positions in both the United States and Canada. After being discovered by Red Steagall, McEntire signed a recording contract with Polygram/Mercury Records in 1975. In 1977, she released her debut, self-titled album, which yielded four singles that low-charting entries on the Billboard Hot Country Songs survey. She had her first major hit as a solo artist with a remake of Patsy Cline's "Sweet Dreams" (1979). 

In the early 1980s, she had several more top ten country hits like "(You Lift Me) Up to Heaven" (1980), "Today All Over Again" (1981), "I'm Not That Lonely Yet" (1982). In 1983, she reached the number on spot on the Billboard country chart for the first time with the singles "Can't Even Get the Blues" and "You're the First Time I Thought About Leaving". In 1984, McEntire switched to MCA Records where she had more creative control over her music. Recording in a more traditional country style, the 1984 singles "How Blue" and "Somebody Should Leave" became her next singles to reach number one. She followed this with a series of number one country singles in both the United States and Canada during the rest of the decade. The singles were "Whoever's in New England", "Little Rock", "What Am I Gonna Do About You", "The Last One to Know", "One Promise Too Late", "Love Will Find Its Way to You", "Cathy's Clown", "I Know How He Feels" and "New Fool at an Old Game".

In 1990, McEntire's commercial success continued with the number one country singles "Rumor Has It", "You Lie" and "Walk On". The following year, an aviation accident killed several of her touring band and crew members. In the wake of the accident, McEntire released an album that spawned several more major hits. This included the Billboard number one country songs "For My Broken Heart" and "Is There Life Out There". Her covers of "Fancy" and "The Night the Lights Went Out in Georgia" also became major North American country hits. Her success continued into mid 1990s with the duets "Does He Love You" and "The Heart Won't Lie". In the second half of the decade she had a continued string of number one country hits with "The Fear of Being Alone", "How Was I to Know" and the duet "If You See Him/If You See Her". 

McEntire branched out into acting and created her own television sitcom during the early 2000s. She didn't record or tour for nearly three years. In 2004, she returned to music with 2003's "I'm Gonna Take That Mountain". This was followed by 2004's "Somebody", which became her first number one hit since 1998. A collection of duet recordings spawned the number two hit with Kelly Clarkson "Because of You". In 2009, she returned with a new collection of songs including the number one single "Consider Me Gone". She entered the next decade with the number one single "Turn on the Radio" in 2011. In her 45-year career, McEntire has garnered 24 number one singles on the Billboard Hot Country Songs chart, the second most number one hits by a female artist behind Dolly Parton with 25. In addition, McEntire holds the record for the most top 10 hits by a female country artist, surpassing Parton's record. In 2020 Reba scored her 57th top 10 hit, "Be A Light", a collaboration with Thomas Rhett, Hillary Scott, Chris Tomlin and Keith Urban.

As lead artist

1970s

1980s

1990s

2000s

2010s

2020s

As a featured artist

Promotional singles

Other charted songs

Notes

References

External links 
 Reba McEntire at Discogs

Country music discographies
Discographies of American artists